Puggioni is an Italian surname. Notable people with the surname include:

Christian Puggioni (born 1981), Italian footballer
Giovanni Puggioni (born 1966), Italian sprinter

Italian-language surnames